The 1980 AFC Asian Cup was the 7th edition of the men's AFC Asian Cup, a quadrennial international football tournament organised by the Asian Football Confederation (AFC). The finals were hosted by Kuwait between 15 and 30 September 1980. The field of ten teams was split into two groups of five. Kuwait won their first championship, beating South Korea in the final 3–0.

Qualification

Venues

Squads
For a list of all squads that played in the final tournament, see 1980 AFC Asian Cup squads.

Group stage

Group A

Group B

Knockout stage

Semi-finals

Third place play-off

Final

Statistics

Goalscorers
7 goals
  Choi Soon-ho
  Behtash Fariba
5 goals
  Faisal Al-Dakhil
4 goals

  Jasem Yaqoub
  Xu Yonglai

3 goals

  Shen Xiangfu
  Hossein Faraki
  Chung Hae-won

2 goals

  Abdolreza Barzegari
  Hamid Alidousti
  Saad Al-Houti
  Tukamin Bahari
  Zulkifli Hamzah
  Choi Jae-pil
  Kim Bok-man
  Pak Jong-hun
  Mansoor Muftah
  Jamal Keshek
  Ahmed Chombi

1 goal

  Ashraf Uddin Ahmed Chunnu
  Kazi Salahuddin
  Chen Jingang
  Li Fubao
  Hassan Roshan
  Iraj Danaeifard
  Abdulaziz Al-Anberi
  Fathi Kameel
  Abdah Alif
 
 
  Hwang Sang-hoi
  Kim Jong-man
 
  Hwang Seok-keun
  Lee Jung-il
  Jawdat Suleiman
  Ghanem Al-Hajri

Awards
Top scorer
  Choi Soon-ho
  Behtash Fariba

Team of the Tournament

Final standings

References

External links
 South Korea International Matches
 Kuwait Football Association
 All-Star Team New Straits Times, 2 October 1980, Page 27
 Details at RSSSF

 
AFC
AFC Asian Cup tournaments
International association football competitions hosted by Kuwait
AFC Asian Cup
AFC Asian Cup